Raymond S. Kellis High School is a public secondary school located in Glendale, Arizona, United States, part of the Peoria Unified School District. The school opened its doors in August 2004 due to overcrowding at Peoria High School and rapid population growth in the surrounding area. The school is the district's fourth-largest, with approximately 1,850 students.

Kellis High School is located near State Farm Stadium, home of the Arizona Cardinals, and Desert Diamond Arena, former home of the Arizona Coyotes.

Clubs and organizations 
 Future Business Leaders of America
 National Honor Society
 Newspaper
 Photo Club
 Kellis Media Arts Club (kMac)
 New Global Citizens
 DECA
 Math and Science Club
 Animal Rights Club
 AP Club
 Fashion Club
 Culinary Club
 Dance
 Katastrophic Hip Hop
 Drama
 Best Buddies
 Art Club

References

External links
 

Public high schools in Arizona
Education in Peoria, Arizona
Educational institutions established in 2004
Schools in Maricopa County, Arizona
Education in Glendale, Arizona
2004 establishments in Arizona